"Ain't Nobody" is a 1983 song by Rufus and Chaka Khan. It has been covered many times, including by LL Cool J, and mixed by Felix Jaehn.

Ain't Nobody may also refer to:
 "Ain't Nobody" (Cody Carnes song), 2022
 "Ain't Nobody" (Faith Evans song), 1995
 "Ain't Nobody" (Monica song), 1996
"Ain't Nobody", song by Clare Maguire from her album Light After Dark, 2011
"Ain't Nobody", song by the band Clover, 1977
"Ain't Nobody", song by Terri Gibbs, 1985
"Ain't Nobody", song by KT Tunstall, 2007
"Ain't Nobody", song by KStewart, 2015

See also